Charbin (also Romanized as Charbīn; also known as Chūbīn) is a village in Niyarak Rural District, Tarom Sofla District, Qazvin County, Qazvin Province, Iran. At the 2006 census, its population was 49, in 12 families.

References 

Populated places in Qazvin County